The Fiat 10 HP was the fifth model of the Italian car manufacturer Fiat. Together with the Fiat 8 HP, it replaced the Fiat 6 HP, being an evolution of this model. The Fiat 6 HP had in turn been based on the Fiat 3.5 HP designed for FIAT by engineer Aristide Faccioli. Both the 6 HP and the 10 HP were also designed by Faccioli. The technology remained the same. However, the seating layout was changed: while the 6 HP offered vis-à-vis seating, the 10 HP was a Phaeton with two rows of seats.

While the 8 HP was specifically developed for commercial use as a taxi, there still were few private buyers for automobiles.

Like the 6 HP model, the 10 HP had a 2-cylinder petrol engine with 1082 cc with two valves per cylinder. This allowed a maximum power of 10 PS. The drive was via a 3-speed manual transmission with chain drive on the rear wheels.  While a steering wheel (instead of a tiller bar) was only available as an option for the 6 HP, it was standard on the 10 HP. The price for a 10 HP with standard equipment amounted to 9,000 Italian lira. Probably due to the increase in consumption due to the higher weight the model was not a success for Fiat. Instead of 20 6 HP models, only 3 or 5 examples, depending on source, were built. In 1901 a successor model for both the 10 HP and the 8 HP was introduced, the Fiat 12 HP.

References

10 HP
Cars introduced in 1901
1900s cars
Veteran vehicles